Umberto Raho (4 June 1922 – 9 January 2016) was an Italian stage, film and television actor.

Life and career 
Born in Bari, the son of an Italian father and a Bulgarian mother, Raho graduated in philosophy and then, immediately after the war, he debuted on stage. While theater was his main activity, Raho was also a very prolific film character actor, with over one hundred credits starting from 1948. He was also active in television films and series.

Death
Raho died on 9 January 2016 in Anzio, Italy, at the age of 93.

Selected filmography

 Fantasmi del mare (1948) - Sottocapo Luigi Serra
 Nefertiti, Queen of the Nile (1961) - Zeton, Priest
 Duel of Champions (1961) - Grand Priest
 Gold of Rome (1961) - Rabbi Beniamino
 A Difficult Life (1961) - (uncredited)
 Charge of the Black Lancers (1962) - Un Altro Membro del Consiglio
 Seven Seas to Calais (1962) - King Philip of Spain
 Imperial Venus (1962) - Kerversau
 Il processo di Verona (1963) - Don Giuseppe Chiot - priest
 The Ghost (1963) - Canon Owens
 Gidget Goes to Rome (1963) - Mario, the Waiter (uncredited)
 La ballata dei mariti (1963) - Hanoi

 Castle of Blood (1964)
 The Long Hair of Death (1964)
 The Last Man on Earth (1964)
 The Betrothed (1964)
 Special Code: Assignment Lost Formula (1966)
 Rififi in Amsterdam (1966) 
 Top Secret (1967) 
 My Name Is Pecos (1967) 
 On My Way to the Crusades, I Met a Girl Who... (1967) 
 Pecos Cleans Up (1967) 
 Avenger X (1967)
 Satanik (1968)
 The Last Chance (1968)
 Madigan's Millions (1968)
 The Cats (1968)
 Diary of a Schizophrenic Girl (1968)
 The Bird with the Crystal Plumage (1970)
 A Girl Called Jules (1970)
 Drummer of Vengeance (1971)
 Valerie Inside Outside (1972)
 Amuck! (1972)
 The Night of the Devils (1972)
 Crimes of the Black Cat (1972)
 Women in Cell Block 7 (1973)
My Pleasure Is Your Pleasure  (1973)
The Flower with the Petals of Steel (1973)
The Eerie Midnight Horror Show (1974)
Bread and Chocolate (1974)
 Extra (1976)
Free Hand for a Tough Cop (1976)
Superfantagenio (1986)

References

External links 
 

1922 births
People from Bari
Italian male stage actors 
Italian male film actors 
Italian male television actors
2016 deaths
Italian people of Bulgarian descent